Events from the year 1852 in France.

Incumbents
 Monarch – Napoleon III (from December 2, monarchy established)

Events
14 January - French Constitution of 1852 enacted by Charles Louis Napoléon Bonaparte (Napoleon III).
29 February - Legislative Election held.
14 March - Legislative Election held.
24 September - Engineer Henri Giffard makes the first airship trip from Paris to Trappes.
21 November - New French Empire confirmed by referendum.
2 December - Napoleon III becomes Emperor of the French.

Births
26 January - Pierre Savorgnan de Brazza, explorer (died 1905)
1 March - Théophile Delcassé, statesman (died 1923)
28 September - Henri Moissan, chemist, Nobel Prize laureate (died 1907)
22 November - Paul-Henri-Benjamin d'Estournelles de Constant, diplomat and politician, recipient of the Nobel Peace Prize (died 1924)
15 December - Henri Becquerel, physicist, Nobel Prize laureate (died 1908)

Deaths
6 January - Louis Braille, teacher, inventor of braille (born 1809)
26 February - Hélène Jégado, domestic servant and serial killer, executed (born 1803)
17 April - Étienne Maurice Gérard, general and statesman (born 1773)
28 May - Eugène Burnouf, orientalist (born 1801)
22 July - Auguste de Marmont, general, nobleman and marshal (born 1774)
26 July - Jean-Jacques Feuchère, sculptor (born 1807)

Full date unknown
Jacques Bernard Hombron, naval surgeon and naturalist (born 1798)

References

1850s in France